is a Japanese manga written and illustrated by Yukari Ichijo. It is serialized in Shueisha's Bessatsu Margaret. Yūkan Club received the 1986 Kodansha Manga Award for the shōjo category. The manga was adapted into an original video animation by Madhouse Studios. It was also adapted into a Japanese television drama.

Media

Manga
Yūkan Club was written and illustrated by Yukari Ichijo. Shueisha released the 19 bound volumes of the manga between December 13, 1982 and November 15, 2002. Shueisha re-released the manga into 10 kanzenban volumes between May 18, 2000 and April 18, 2002. Shueisha re-released the manga a second time into 9 kanzenban volumes. The third revision of the manga was called . The first three kanzenban volumes were released simultaneously on October 15, 2007. The next three kanzenban volumes were released on November 15, 2007. The final three kanzenban volumes were released on December 14, 2007. The manga is licensed in Indonesia by Elex Media Komputindo.

OVAs
The manga was adapted into an original video animation. The first OVA's ending theme was "Shake Dance" by Toy Boys, while "Rainy Dance", also by Toy Boys, was the second OVA's ending theme. The first OVA was released on a VHS on July 25, 1991. The second OVA premiered on December 14, 1991 as a film, in Toho cinemas. The second OVA was released on April 25, 1992. Both of the VHSs were released by Madhouse Studios.

TV Drama
Directed by Oya Taro, the drama's 10 episodes were broadcast on Nippon Television between October 16, 2007 and December 18, 2007. On April 23, 2008, VAP released a DVD Box set containing five DVDs, spanning the 10 episodes of the drama. The theme song of the series is "Keep The Faith" by KAT-TUN. It was voted the fifth best selling single listed on the Oricon charts in 2007.

Main Casts:
Akanishi Jin as Shochikubai Miroku
Yokoyama Yu as Kikumasamune Seishiro
Taguchi Junnosuke as Bido Granmarie
Minami as Kenbishi Yuri
Kashii Yu as Hakushika Noriko
Emi Suzuki as Kizakura Karen
Kaga Takeshi as Shochikubai Jishu
Kataoka Tsurutaro as Kenbishi Mansaku
Kato Kazuko as Kenbishi Yuriko

On November 21, 2007, Sony Music Entertainment released a single for the theme song of the drama. The lyrics were written by Kyosuke Himuro. On November 28, 2007, wint released a soundtrack CD for Yūkan Club. The songs are sung by Jin Akanishi and are composed by Kyosuke Himuro.

Yūkan Club won four of the five awards at the 2007 Nikkan Sports Drama Grand Prix. Jin Akanishi was awarded best actor; Junnosuke Taguchi was awarded best supporting actor; Yu Kashii was awarded best supporting actress and Yūkan Club was awarded best drama of 2007.

References

External links
 Official Shueisha Yūkan Club website 
 OfficialYukan Club Japanese drama website 
 
 

1982 manga
1991 anime OVAs
2007 Japanese television series debuts
Comedy anime and manga
Japanese television dramas based on manga
Magic Bus (studio)
Nippon TV dramas
Shōjo manga
Shueisha franchises
Shueisha manga
Winner of Kodansha Manga Award (Shōjo)
Television shows written by Eriko Shinozaki